Dikomo is a town in Cyprus, located about halfway between Nicosia and Kyrenia. De facto, it is under the control of Northern Cyprus.

The town consists of two parts:
 Kato Dikomo
 Pano Dikomo

Dikomo is first mentioned in sources in a chronicle by Neophytos the Recluse on a raid on Cyprus in 1155/56. It was close to the site of a battle between the Byzantine forces and the forces of Raynald of Châtillon, who had landed in Kyrenia and further advanced to Nicosia.

Famous locals 
 Dimitris Christofias, former president of Cyprus, born in Dikomo
 Georgios Savvides, AKEL MP 1970–1991, born in Dikomo
 Christodoulos Taramountas, Democratic Rally and European Democracy MP, born in Dikomo

Churches 

Prophet Zacharias Church, Saint George Church, Church of the Virgin Mary of the Fields, The Chapel of Saint Dimitris

References 

Populated places in Girne District
Municipalities of Northern Cyprus